Jimmie William Price (born October 13, 1941) is a former professional baseball catcher, who played in Major League Baseball (MLB) for the Detroit Tigers from  to . He is also the current color commentator for the Detroit Tigers Radio Network.

Baseball career
For Price’s efforts he was named the Pirates Minor League Player of the Year. His MLB debut came with the 1967 Tigers, after his contract was purchased from the Pirates. 1967 was also Price’s best big league season, when he hit .261 in 44 games.

Price also played on the 1968 Tigers, who won the World Series over the St. Louis Cardinals in seven games. During his time with the Tigers, Price served as the backup catcher to starter Bill Freehan.  His final season in MLB was 1971 with Detroit.

Softball career
Price played in the 1979 season for the Detroit Caesars in the American Professional Slow Pitch Softball League (APSPL).  The Caesars were owned by Mike Ilitch, a former Detroit Tigers farmhand and later the owner of the MLB team.  The Caesars were his first step into professional sports ownership.

The Caesars played at Memorial Field in Eastpointe, Michigan, a small suburb of Detroit and featured several former Detroit Tigers such as Price, Jim Northrup, Mickey Stanley, and Norm Cash, largely in promotional roles.  The Caesars disbanded at the end of the 1979 season.

Broadcasting career
Price began his broadcasting career after retiring from baseball, working in local television in the Detroit area and for the fledgling ESPN, serving as an announcer for the first live sports broadcast on the network, the APSPL World Series for professional softball in 1979.  

ESPN Broadcast, 1979 APSPL World Series, Game 8, Milwaukee at Kentucky

He first worked as a color analyst on the Tigers' cable telecasts with PASS Sports in 1993, moving to the Detroit Tigers Radio Network in 1998. He worked alongside Hall of Fame broadcaster Ernie Harwell from 1999 to 2002. Currently, Price teams with play-by-play announcer Dan Dickerson on the Tigers' radio broadcasts. As a former catcher, Price offers insight into baseball strategy, especially into pitching strategy including each pitcher's "arsenal." Since he handled pitchers in his major league career, Price informs fans about approaches to various hitters. He often refers to the Tigers as "we."

Price was absent for five games early in the 2012 season due to health trouble. According to Price, he had not previously missed an assignment in twenty years. In May, Price would miss a nine-game road trip, again for health reasons. He was replaced in both absences by former Tigers pitcher Dan Petry.

Quirks and signature phrases

For several years Price called play-by-play of the middle innings of each radio broadcast, and often announced "[player name]...touch 'em all" after a Tiger hit a home run.   Another trademark of his is saying "nice area" whenever a city in Michigan is mentioned, most often by his broadcasting partner. At the start of each game broadcast, Jim Price says 'Beautiful' after partner Dickerson welcomes the listeners.

Price often talks about "the art of pitching" when a Tiger pitcher is having a good game. After a particularly good curve ball is thrown, he will label it as a "yellowhammer," in reference to the bird who dives to the ground quickly. When a hitter connects solidly with the ball, Price will frequently say that the batter put his "buggy whip" or "double buggy whip" on it, or that the ball was in his "buggy whip" area.

Notable awards and charity work
Price – whose son, Jackson, is autistic – was instrumental in the formation of Jack's Place For Autism, a non-profit organization designed to assist families affected by the disability.

Price was inducted in the Kinston Professional Baseball Hall of Fame, in 1995.

References

External links

Jim Price bio at WXYT.com
Jim Price at Baseball Biography

1941 births
Living people
American sports announcers
Detroit Tigers announcers
Detroit Tigers players
Grand Forks Chiefs players
Kinston Eagles players
Kingsport Pirates players
Columbus Jets players
Major League Baseball catchers
Baseball players from Harrisburg, Pennsylvania
Major League Baseball broadcasters
Sportspeople from Harrisburg, Pennsylvania